Thomas Kielinger  (born July 1940 in Danzig) is a German journalist, political commentator and author, who for a long time used to be London correspondent for Die Welt.

Biography
Kielinger was born in 1940 in Danzig (modern day Gdańsk in Poland), the youngest of six children. He studied at the Universities of Münster and Bochum (where he took a graduate degree), as well as the University of Cardiff where in the 1960s he stayed for three years as a Lector in the German department.

Career
In 1971 he joined the German daily national newspaper Die Welt in Hamburg as its literary critic. In 1977, he was made Die Welt's chief correspondent in Washington DC to coincide with the inauguration of the United States President Jimmy Carter, and later in the era of Ronald Reagan.

After his time in the USA, he became Editor-in-Chief of the German weekly newspaper Rheinischer Merkur from 1985 to 1994. From 1994 to 1998 he pursued his own business as writer, broadcaster and political consultant. In 1998 he was invited to rejoin Die Welt, to become the paper's correspondent in London.

Kielinger was for many years on the jury of the Theodor Wolff Prize, and a jury member of the Lenkungsausschuss at the Königswinter Conference. He is a regular panelist on the BBC News weekly news discussion programme featuring a roundtable panel of foreign and British journalists Dateline London.

Several books testify to his abiding interest in Anglo-German history: Crossroads and Roundabouts: Junctions in German-British Relations (1997), Großbritannien, a country portrait as part of a series called "Die Deutschen und ihre Nachbarn" (The Germans and Their Neighbours, 2009; revised edition 2016), as well as a biography of the Queen, Elizabeth II – Das Leben der Queen (2011; dtv paperback 2014). The latter was also favourably reviewed in The Times Literary Supplement, where it was stated that "amid all the warm words about the Queen's commitment to duty, it is Thomas Kielinger who comes closest to explaining what motivates Elizabeth II".

In 2014 Kielinger added another biography to his list of publications: Winston Churchill – Der späte Held (Winston Churchill – The Late Hero), which reached its 5th edition in 2015 and is available in paperback, as well as in an audio version (11 CDs), read by performer and author Gerd Heidenreich. It has been translated into Danish and Polish.

His latest biography is appearing in Spring 2019, about the Tudor Queen, Elizabeth I.

Awards
2016 Honorary Fellow of Cardiff University and of Queen Mary College London
2001 Federal Cross of Merit, First Class
1995 Honorary Officer of the Order of the British Empire (OBE)
1993 Honorary Fellow of the Cardiff School of Journalism
1990 Carlo-Schmid prize, together with Gerhard v. Glinski
1985 Theodor Wolff Prize

Publications
"Die Königin: Elisabeth I. und der Kampf um England", C. H. Beck 2019, 
"Kleine Geschichte Grossbritanniens", C. H. Beck 2016, 
"Winston Churchill – Der späte Held", C. H. Beck 2014, 
"Elizabeth II. : das Leben der Queen", C.H.Beck 2011, 
"Großbritannien", C.H.Beck 2009, 
"Die Kreuzung und der Kreisverkehr : Deutsche und Briten im Zentrum der europäischen Geschichte", Bouvier 1997, 
"Crossroads and roundabouts : junctions in German-British relations", Bouvier 1997, 
"Orpheus im Intercity : Gedichte und Essay", Neske Stuttgart 1991, 
"Im Sog der Freiheit : Aufsätze zu Politik und Kultur", Bouvier 1991, 
"Wohin mit Deutschland? : Vereint an der Schwelle eines schwierigen Jahrzehnts", (ed.) Bouvier 1991,

References

External links

Thomas Kielinger: "EU referendum speech: why Angela Merkel needs David Cameron, but not at expense of France" (The Telegraph 26/01/2013)
Embassy of the Federal Republic of Germany London: "Thomas Kielinger presents biography of Queen Elizabeth II" (Last updated: 13 December 2011)
Thomas Kielinger: "We don't want to colonise Europe" (The Telegraph 30/11/2011)
Thomas Kielinger: "England v Germany: Through the eyes of our children" (The Telegraph 26/06/2010)
Thomas Kielinger: "Köhler should not have resigned. All he did was tell the truth" (The Independent 01/06/2010)
Thomas Kielinger: "The bulldog voice of Britain" (The Observer 21/10/2007)
Thomas Kielinger: "Germany's grown up, now it's your turn" (The Telegraph 11/06/2006)
Thomas Kielinger: "Please do mention the war, especially to the royal fool" (The Observer 16/01/2005)
Thomas Kielinger: "We Germans can never escape" (The Observer 30/05/2004)

1940 births
Living people
Writers from Gdańsk
Alumni of Cardiff University
German journalists
German male journalists
German newspaper journalists
20th-century German journalists
21st-century German journalists
Die Welt people
German expatriates in the United Kingdom
Officers Crosses of the Order of Merit of the Federal Republic of Germany
Officers of the Order of the British Empire
People from West Prussia
German male writers